The Central Band of the Border Guard Service of the Federal Security Service of Russia, also known as the Russian Frontier Guard Band is a special military unit that is the official flagship military band for the Border Service of the FSB of Russia. The band is a branch of the Military Band Service of the Armed Forces of Russia and is one of the leading music ensembles in the Russian Federation. It is professionally associated with the Ministry of Culture of Russia.

Purpose
The band regularly participates in national events and holidays, especially ones that have the participation of the President of Russia and leaders of the Border Guard Service of Russia and members of the State Duma and the Federation Council. In addition, it frequently holds concerts for soldiers of the Border Guard Service. The band closely cooperates with government organizations and artistic groups, as well as actively tours Russia and abroad, commonly performing on the radio and television.

Administration
 Director of Music and Band Artistic Director - Colonel Andrey Kapralov
 Conductor - Lieutenant Colonel Alexey Strenadko 
 Conductor/Bandmaster - Major Vladimir Kolovanov
 Chief Ballet Master - Gennadiy Minkh

Ensembles 
 Brass Band
 Symphony Orchestra
 Wind Band 
 Big Band (established in 1989)
 Ballet Ensemble (established in 1997)

Events 
The band is primary engaged in providing accompaniment for the Border Service of the FSB and takes part in leading social and cultural events both nationally and internationally.

 Defender of the Fatherland Day
 National Flag Day
 Victory Day (9 May)
 Russia Day
 Border Guards Day
 October Revolution Day

During its 50-year history, the band has also performed in countries such as Belarus, Tajikistan, Uzbekistan, Armenia, Latvia, Estonia, the United States, Germany, Poland, Austria and Norway.

See also
 Border Service of the Federal Security Service of the Russian Federation
 Federal Security Service

Articles about related military bands:

 Military Band Service of the Armed Forces of Russia
 Central Military Band of the Ministry of Defense of Russia
 Military Band Service of the Ministry of Emergency Situations of Russia
 Military Band Service of the National Guard of Russia
 Police Band Service of the Ministry of Interior of Russia

References 

Russian military bands
Federal Security Service
Military units and formations established in 1978
Musical groups established in 1978
1978 establishments in the Soviet Union
Soviet Border Troops
Soviet musical groups